Michael Babcock Jr. (born April 29, 1963) is a Canadian former ice hockey coach. He spent parts of eighteen seasons as a professional and head coach in the National Hockey League (NHL). He began as head coach of the Mighty Ducks of Anaheim, whom he led to the 2003 Stanley Cup Finals. In 2005, Babcock signed with the Detroit Red Wings, winning the Stanley Cup with them in 2008, and helping them to the Stanley Cup playoffs every year during his tenure, becoming the winningest coach in Red Wings history. In 2015, he left Detroit to coach the Toronto Maple Leafs, a position he held until 2019.

Babcock was born in Manitouwadge, Ontario, and grew up in Saskatoon, Saskatchewan. He guided the Red Wings to the Stanley Cup in 2008; he led Team Canada to gold at the IIHF Ice Hockey World Championships in 2004; and he led Team Canada to gold at both the 2010 Winter Olympics in Vancouver, and the 2014 Winter Olympics in Sochi. Babcock is the only coach to win six distinct national or international titles. In addition to the three distinct titles described above, he guided Canada to gold at the 2016 World Cup of Hockey, to gold at the IIHF World Junior Championships in 1997, and the University of Lethbridge to the CIS University Cup in 1994. During his professional coaching tenure from 1991–2019, Babcock's teams missed the post-season only four times.

Education and playing career

Babcock played for the Saskatoon Blades of the Western Hockey League (WHL) in 1980–81, and spent a season with the WHL Kelowna Wings in 1982–83. In between, he played a year under Dave King at the University of Saskatchewan, and transferred to McGill University in 1983, to play for coach Ken Tyler. In September 1985, Babcock also had a brief try-out with the NHL's Vancouver Canucks. While at McGill University, Babcock joined the Tau Alpha chapter of Delta Kappa Epsilon fraternity.

Babcock graduated from McGill in 1986 with a bachelor's degree in physical education, and also did some post-graduate work in sports psychology. In 146 career games with the Redmen, he tallied 22 goals and 85 assists for a total of 107 points and 301 penalty minutes, graduating as the second-highest scoring defenceman in McGill history. Playing for McGill from four seasons, 1983–84 to 1986–87, he was a two-time all-star rearguard, served as captain, and also won the Bobby Bell trophy as team MVP.

On November 25, 2013, he was awarded the honorary degree of Doctor of Laws (LL.D.) by McGill University. On June 2, 2016, Babcock was awarded an honorary Doctor of Laws (LL.D.) by the University of Saskatchewan.

Player-coach
He moved to the United Kingdom in 1987 as a player-coach for Whitley Warriors, who missed out on the league title by two points. In 49 games, he contributed 45 goals and 127 assists, accumulating 123 penalty minutes.

Coaching career
Babcock is one of four McGill University players to coach an NHL team (Lester Patrick with the New York Rangers; George Burnett with the Edmonton Oilers; and Guy Boucher with the Ottawa Senators). In 2008, Babcock became the second McGill hockey player to coach a Stanley Cup winner, the first being Lester Patrick.

Babcock has had a distinguished coaching career, and entered the 2011–12 season with a lifetime 798–540–148 regular season coaching record in 18 seasons overall, including a 373–188–95 NHL mark in eight seasons (two with Anaheim and six with Detroit). He also guided Team Canada to gold medals at the 1997 world junior championships in Geneva, the 2004 IIHF world hockey championships in Prague, the 2010 Winter Olympics in Vancouver, the 2014 Winter Olympics in Sochi and the 2016 World Cup of Hockey in Toronto. In addition, he guided the University of Lethbridge to a CIS national title in 1994.

Detroit marked the seventh coaching stint for the nomadic Babcock, a native of Saskatoon, SK, who has lived in six Canadian provinces (Saskatchewan, Quebec, Alberta, Ontario, British Columbia, and Manitoba) and four American states (Washington, Ohio, California, and Michigan).

Red Deer College
In 1988, Babcock was appointed head coach at Red Deer College in Alberta. He spent three seasons at the school, winning the provincial collegiate championship and earning coach-of-the-year honours in 1989.

Moose Jaw – WHL
Babcock moved to the Western Hockey League (WHL) in 1991, where he guided the Moose Jaw Warriors for a two-year term.

University of Lethbridge – CIS
He then served one season as coach of the University of Lethbridge Pronghorns, earning Canada West coach-of-the-year honours in 1993–94 after guiding Lethbridge to their first-ever appearance in post-season play and a Canadian university national title with a 34–11–3 overall mark.

Spokane – WHL
In 1994, he was appointed coach of the WHL's Spokane Chiefs, where he posted a regular-season record of 224–172–29 over six seasons for a .564 winning percentage. He was named twice as the West Division coach of the year (1995–1996 and 1999–2000).

Cincinnati – AHL
From 2000–01 to 2001–02, Babcock guided the American Hockey League's Cincinnati Mighty Ducks to a 74–59–20–7 record, including a franchise-high 41 wins and 95 points. The team qualified for the playoffs both years.

NHL

Mighty Ducks of Anaheim
Babcock was named head coach of the NHL's Mighty Ducks of Anaheim on May 22, 2002, and through two seasons, guided them to a combined 69–62–19 regular season record (including 14 overtime losses). In the Stanley Cup playoffs with the Ducks, he posted a 15–6 record, leading the Mighty Ducks to the 2003 Stanley Cup Finals, where they lost in seven games to the New Jersey Devils.

Detroit Red Wings
Following the 2004–05 NHL lockout, Babcock declined an offer to remain with the Ducks, and on July 15, 2005, was named head coach of the Detroit Red Wings. In his first three seasons, Babcock led the Red Wings to a combined 162–56–28 regular season record and a 28–18 playoff record. He and the Red Wings were eliminated by his former club, the Anaheim Ducks, in the Western Conference Finals of the 2007 playoffs.

In the 2007–08 season, Babcock earned his 200th NHL career win in Detroit's 5–2 victory over the Florida Panthers on December 15, 2007. Heading into the 2008 All-Star Game, as the top team in the NHL, Babcock was selected to coach the Western Conference in the All-Star Game. On June 4, 2008, he led the Red Wings to another Stanley Cup championship by defeating the Pittsburgh Penguins in six games.

Babcock was announced as a finalist for the Jack Adams Award for the 2007–08 season, awarded to the coach who best contributes to his team's success, but ultimately finished third behind Bruce Boudreau of the Washington Capitals and Guy Carbonneau of the Montreal Canadiens.

In June 2008, Babcock signed a three-year contract extension with the Red Wings. In the 2008–09 season, the Red Wings again made the Stanley Cup Final, but lost in seven games to the Pittsburgh Penguins. With the loss in Game 7, Babcock became the first head coach to lose a Stanley Cup Final Game 7 with two different teams.

In the 2011 playoffs, Babcock's Red Wings fell behind the San Jose Sharks three games to none in the second round, but won three-straight to force a Game 7, which the Wings lost 3–2. At this point in his coaching career, Babcock had accumulated an impressive NHL playoff record of 63–39.

In October 2010, Babcock signed a four-year extension with the Red Wings that saw him through to the end of the 2014–15 season.

On April 8, 2014, Babcock earned his 414th career win as head coach of the Red Wings, surpassing Jack Adams as the winningest coach in Red Wings history. Babcock was announced as a finalist for the Jack Adams Award for the 2013–14 season, his second nomination, but finished second in voting behind Patrick Roy of the Colorado Avalanche. On December 6, 2014, Babcock earned his 500th career win as a head coach, becoming the second-fastest coach in NHL history to do so; only Hockey Hall of Famer and former Red Wings coach Scotty Bowman reached the 500-win plateau faster.

Toronto Maple Leafs
After failing to come to terms on a contract extension with the Red Wings, Babcock requested and received permission to seek employment elsewhere on May 8, 2015. The Buffalo Sabres were considered the most serious contenders for Babcock's services, with the St. Louis Blues and San Jose Sharks also being in the mix. However, on May 20, 2015, it was announced that Babcock would become the new head coach of the Toronto Maple Leafs. He reportedly signed an eight-year contract worth $50 million (an average of $6.25 million per season), making him the highest-paid coach in NHL history by more than double the previous record holder's annual earnings. Prior to Babcock signing the contract, Todd McLellan of the Edmonton Oilers was the highest-paid coach in the NHL, reportedly earning $3 million per season.

On February 4, 2016, in a game against the New Jersey Devils, Babcock coached his 1,000 NHL game. The Maple Leafs finished last in the entire league during Babcock's first year, compiling a record of 29–42–11 and 69 points. Despite this, praise was given to Babcock's coaching and patience with a team that was expected to do extremely poorly. This season was also the first time Babcock missed the playoffs since the 2004 playoffs when he was with the Mighty Ducks.

The last place finish helped the Maple Leafs win the draft lottery, and the number one pick was used to select coveted centre Auston Matthews. The next season was marked by many high-end rookies in Toronto's system, including Matthews, William Nylander, Mitch Marner, Nikita Zaitsev and Connor Brown, among others, making the team to play out the 2016–17 season. Babcock worked closely with these rookies, and their youthful energy and talent, coupled with the addition of goaltender Frederik Andersen, allowed the team to qualify for the playoffs, marking a rare occasion where a team goes from last in the league to capturing a playoff appearance. Toronto faced the top-seeded Washington Capitals in the first round, and though many analyzed the series as lopsided in the Capitals' favour, the Maple Leafs again defied expectations, pushing the Capitals to six games (with five going to overtime, tying an NHL record) before the team was eliminated by the Capitals. Babcock's coaching was praised throughout the playoffs as it was during the regular season, with many lauding his attempts at player development while maintaining a high level of team success. In recognition for these achievements throughout the season, Babcock was nominated for the Jack Adams Award, but once again lost to John Tortorella of the Columbus Blue Jackets.

On November 20, 2019, the Maple Leafs fired Babcock after a six-game losing streak and amidst allegations of a toxic work environment. At the time, the team had a record of 9–10–4 and were outside of the playoffs, despite being projected before the season began to be Stanley Cup contenders. This was the first time in Babcock's professional coaching career that he had been fired.

University of Saskatchewan 
On February 20, 2021, the University of Saskatchewan announced that Babcock would become the coach of the Men's Hockey Team for two seasons starting May 2021.  However, he resigned on August 25, 2022. He later announced his retirement the following day.

Coaching style
Babcock's teams generally focus on skills and puck possession over physical play and toughness.

Babcock continued his tradition of building a team with skills rather than enforcement in Detroit. Since the 2005–06 season, Babcock's teams have consistently had the fewest penalty minutes of any NHL team. From 2005 to 2015, the Red Wings averaged 22 percent fewer penalty minutes than the league average, and 44 percent fewer penalty minutes than the highest league total.

Criticism 
Since his tenure with the Maple Leafs ended, Babcock has faced criticism for his management style and his treatment of his players. Johan Franzén, who played for Babcock in Detroit, praised Babcock's preparation and tactical acuity as a coach, but called him a "terrible man, the worst person I've ever met" and accused Babcock of verbally abusing him, which was corroborated by former teammate Chris Chelios. Babcock was also accused of mistreating Mitch Marner during his rookie season, by asking him to rank his teammates in order of their work ethic and later sharing the list with the rest of the team. Babcock confirmed the incident after it was reported, expressing his regret and stating that he had apologized to Marner at the time. 

Babcock has been accused of scratching players ahead of games that are of personal significance, such as removing Mike Modano from the lineup prior to his 1500th game, and not playing Jason Spezza in the Maple Leafs opening night game against his former team the Ottawa Senators.

International coaching career
Babcock coached Canada's team at the 1997 World Junior Championships, where the country won a fifth consecutive gold medal.

On June 24, 2009, Babcock was announced as the head coach of Canada's men's national ice hockey team for the 2010 Winter Olympics in Vancouver, British Columbia. The team finished the round robin with a regulation win over Norway, a shootout win over Switzerland, and a loss to the United States. In the elimination rounds they defeated Germany, Russia, and then Slovakia to advance to the gold medal game where they defeated the United States 3–2 in single overtime.

With the win Babcock became the first coach (and only thus far) in the International Ice Hockey Federation's Triple Gold Club. In addition to the Olympic gold, Babcock earned a World Championship title coaching Canada in 2004 and a Stanley Cup championship coaching the Detroit Red Wings in 2008.

To honour Babcock's entrance into the Triple Gold Club, the City of Saskatoon announced that July 17, 2010, will be known as "Mike Babcock Day."

On July 22, 2013, Babcock was announced as the head coach of Canada's men's national ice hockey team for the 2014 Winter Olympics in Sochi. The team finished the round robin with regulation wins over Norway, and Austria, and an overtime win over Finland. In the quarterfinals they defeated Latvia, and in the semifinals they defeated the United States to advance to the gold medal game, where they defeated Sweden 3–0. With the win, Babcock became only the second (Viktor Tikhonov led the Soviet team in 1984 and 1988) head coach to lead one country to a gold medal victory in consecutive Olympic appearances.

Babcock coached Canada to victory at the 2016 World Cup of Hockey on September 29, 2016, making him the first and only coach to date to have won the Stanley Cup, coach a team to an Olympic gold medal, a World Cup, a World Championship, and a World Junior Championship.

Personal life
Mike and his wife, Maureen have three children: Alexandra, Michael III, and Taylor. Although he was born in Manitouwadge, Ontario, he grew up in Saskatoon, Saskatchewan. He spent the majority of his childhood moving around between Northern Ontario, Manitoba and the Northwest Territories, before his family settled in Saskatoon, which he considers his hometown, in 1975. Babcock attended both St. James Elementary School (since closed) and Holy Cross High School on Saskatoon's east side. Babcock is one of the many notable graduates on Holy Cross High School's "Wall of Honour."

Babcock is an outspoken advocate for Bell Let's Talk, CAMH, and other mental health awareness campaigns. In 2017, he became involved with a campaign called Ahead of the Game to raise money for youth mental health in sport.

Babcock was made a member of the Order of Hockey in Canada in 2018.

Head coaching record

WHL

AHL

NHL

References

1963 births
Living people
Anaheim Ducks coaches
Canada men's national ice hockey team coaches
Canadian expatriate ice hockey players in England
Canadian ice hockey coaches
Detroit Red Wings coaches
Kelowna Wings players
McGill Redmen ice hockey players
Moose Jaw Warriors coaches
Order of Hockey in Canada recipients
Saskatoon Blades players
Spokane Chiefs coaches
Sportspeople from Saskatoon
Stanley Cup champions
Stanley Cup championship-winning head coaches
Triple Gold Club
Toronto Maple Leafs coaches
University of Saskatchewan alumni
Whitley Warriors players
People from Northville, Michigan
Ice hockey coaches at the 2010 Winter Olympics
Ice hockey coaches at the 2014 Winter Olympics